The Richibucto River is a river in eastern New Brunswick, Canada which empties into the Northumberland Strait north of Richibucto. It is 80 kilometres long.

The river's name means "river of fire" in the Mi'kmaq language.

Other villages situated along the river include Rexton and Elsipogtog First Nation. Bonar Law, the British prime minister, was raised along the river.

Tributaries
Bass River, Weldford Parish, New Brunswick
Coal Branch River
Molus River
St. Nicholas River
East Branch St. Nicholas River
South Branch St. Nicholas River
West Branch St. Nicholas River
St. Charles River

River communities
Browns Yard
Elsipogtog First Nation
Jardineville
Jerrys Island
Lower Main River
Rexton
Richibucto
Upper Rexton

River crossings
Route 11
Route 134
Route 490
Indian House Road

See also
List of bodies of water of New Brunswick

References

Rivers of New Brunswick